Rebound: The Legend of Earl "The Goat" Manigault is a 1996 HBO television film about Earl Manigault, a legendary  American street basketball player famous under his nickname of "The Goat."

The film written by Alan Swyer and Larry Golin and directed by Eriq La Salle stars Don Cheadle in the title role of Manigault. Former professional basketball player Nigel Miguel provided basketball training to the cast, and worked with La Salle to coordinate and stage the basketball scenes.

Cast
Don Cheadle ...  Earl Manigault 
James Earl Jones ...  Dr. McDuffie 
Michael Beach ...  Legrand 
Clarence Williams III ...  Coach Pratt 
Eriq La Salle ...  Diego 
Forest Whitaker ...  Mr. Rucker
Ronny Cox ...  Coach Scarpelli 
Loretta Devine ...  Miss Mary 
Glynn Turman ...  Coach Powell 
Monica Calhoun ...  Evonne 
Colin Cheadle ...  Young Earl 
Michael Ralph ...  Dion 
Daryl Mitchell ...  Dean Meminger
Nicole Ari Parker ...  Wanda
Tamara Tunie ...  Miss Marcus 
Kareem Abdul-Jabbar ...  Himself 
Chick Hearn ...  Himself 
Cress Williams ...  Kimbrough
Kevin Garnett ... Wilt Chamberlain
Gary Maloncon ... Nate Bowman
Nigel Miguel ... Sonny Johnson

References

External links
 

1996 films
American basketball films
HBO Films films
African-American films
Films by African-American directors
Biographical films about sportspeople
Cultural depictions of basketball players
1990s American films